The Boys is a 1962 Finnish war drama film directed by Mikko Niskanen. It is based on a 1958 novel by Paavo Rintala. It was entered into the 3rd Moscow International Film Festival. The second lead role, Jake, was played by 17-year-old Vesa-Matti Loiri, who received the Jussi Awards certificate of honor for his role as a young actor.

The story conveys the life of school boys in the turbulent period of the World War II in Oulu in northern Finland. The young men, in the absence of their fathers who have gone to war, are fascinated by war and the German Army soldiers and dream of heroic deeds.

Cast
 Pentti Tarkiainen as Ilmari Kaarela, "Immu"
 Vesa-Matti Loiri as Jaakko Hoikka, "Jake" (as Matti Loiri)
 Uti Saurio as Paavo Harju, "Pate"
 Hannu Vironmäki as Matti Korpi
 Markku Söderström as Urkki
 Heikki Rissanen as Kaaleppi (from Tuira)
 Ilkka Liikanen as Martti (from Tuira)
 Martti Isosalo as Topi (from Tuira)
 Reima Eskelinen as A boy from Tuira
 Jorma Valtanen as A boy from Tuira
 Liisa Nevalainen as Jake's mother
 Kauko Helovirta as Capt. Fritz Mayer ("Uncle Fritz")
 Olavi Ahonen as Priest Pisa

References

External links

1962 films
1960s Finnish-language films
Finnish war drama films
Films based on Finnish novels
1960s war drama films
1962 drama films
Finnish World War II films